Clarkson House may refer to:

Clarkson House (Flaherty, Kentucky), listed on the U.S. National Register of Historic Places (NRHP)
Clarkson House (Lewiston, New York), NRHP-listed
Clarkson-Knowles Cottage, Potsdam, New York, NRHP-listed
Clarkson-Watson House, Philadelphia, Pennsylvania, NRHP-listed